Alice Lee Marriott, née Goulding (8 January 1910 – 18 March 1992), was an American historian and anthropologist of the American Southwest and Native Americans. She is a member of the Oklahoma Historians Hall of Fame.

Life and work
Marriott was born in Wilmette, Illinois, on 8 January 1910.
She was awarded a B.A. degree in English and French by Oklahoma City University in 1930 and a B.A. in anthropology by the University of Oklahoma five years later. Marriott was the first woman to earn an anthropology degree from the University of Oklahoma. She spent the summers of 1935 and 1936 conducting fieldwork among the Modoc Indians in southern Oregon and the Kiowa in southwestern Oklahoma. Marriott was a field representative with the U.S. Department of Interior Indian Arts and Craft Board in 1938–42 and then she worked for the American Red Cross in the Southwest until 1945. That year she began writing The Ten Grandmothers with her frequent collaborator, archaeologist Carol K. Rachlin, for the University of Oklahoma Press. Eight more solo books on Native American and Southwestern topics followed by 1953 and she was awarded the University of Oklahoma Achievement Award in 1952. Marriott published a biography, Sequoyah: Leader of the Cherokees, in 1956 and then followed it with Black Stone Knife the following year. She became a consultant to the Oklahoma Indian Council in 1961 and was appointed associate professor of anthropology at the University of Oklahoma from 1964 to 1966. Two years later, Marriott became artist-in-residence at Central State University in Edmond, Oklahoma, and won the Oklahoma City University Achievement Award. In 1968 she published with Carol K. Rachlin American Indian Mythology. As a freelancer, she continued to write, producing four more books with Rachlin by 1975. She was posthumously inducted into the Oklahoma Historians Hall of Fame in 2004. Nothing further is known of her life.
She died in Oklahoma City on March 18, 1992.

Notes

References

1910 births
1992 deaths
Oklahoma City University alumni
University of Oklahoma alumni
20th-century American historians